The International Studies Journal (ISJ) (Faṣlnāmah-i muṭālaʻāt-i bayn al-milalī) is an international academic journal dealing with the Middle East. It is published quarterly since 2004, in both English and Persian, with some articles in French. It is distributed in Iran and overseas, and run by a group of faculty from Iran and elsewhere.

The scope includes both the modern middle east, and international social and legal issue having some relation to the area and the problems.

The Editor in Chief is  Pr. Dr. Mehdi Zakerian.  President, Iranian International Studies Association.

References

External links
Journal website.
Sample page.

Magazines published in Iran
International relations journals
Publications established in 2004
Quarterly journals